The Hinteri Egg is a mountain of the Jura, located south of Reigoldswil in the Swiss canton of Basel-Landschaft, close to the border with the canton of Solothurn.

The Hinteri Egg reaches a height of 1,169 metres above sea level and is the highest point of the canton of Basel-Landschaft.

References

External links
Hinteri Egg on Hikr

Mountains of Switzerland
Mountains of Basel-Landschaft
Highest points of Swiss cantons
Mountains of the Jura
One-thousanders of Switzerland